Walpole High School (WHS) is a four-year public high school in Walpole, Massachusetts, United States, within Norfolk County. The school educates students grades 9 through 12 and is the only high school in the Walpole Public School district. As of 2013, the school has about 1,300 students and over 90 faculty and staff members. The campus is located one mile from downtown Walpole on Common Street.

The school is mainly focused on college preparatory subjects, with over 90 percent of its graduates typically going on to higher education. It is accredited is by the New England Association of Secondary Schools.

WHS was founded in 1870; the current building was originally built in 1907 and underwent a major renovation/addition in 2000-2002 thereby adding many new classrooms, labs, a new library, and cafeteria as well as a general modernization of the interior.

Curriculum
Walpole High School offers many academic courses in various levels to challenge students in English, foreign language, history, mathematics and sciences.

The former assistant superintendent, Jean Kenney stated in 2015 that almost every student takes at least two years of foreign language instruction even though the high school only requires one year. As of 2015, foreign languages offered included French, German, Latin, Mandarin Chinese, and Spanish. That year, about 600 students studied Spanish, about 150 studied French, about 100 studied Latin, about 45 students studied German, and about 30 studied Chinese. Kenney stated in 2015 that many students take at least two foreign languages. The former chairperson of foreign languages, George Watson, promoted establishing German classes, saying that there was a need to offer a foreign language not in the Romance languages. As of 2015, few other schools in Massachusetts offered German.

Additionally, WHS offers an extensive choice of electives and AP classes covering all academic areas.

Extracurricular activities
Walpole High School offers extracurricular activities including varsity level sports, a student council, a robotics team, an annual film festival, a dance company, a best buddies club, a speech and debate team, an orchestra, a band, a chorus, and a theatre program. The school also offers a television program in a television studio.

Controversies
The school's sports teams were named "Rebels" in 1966, leading to decades of incorporation of the confederate flag and singing "Dixie" in sporting events and hazing rituals. After criticism that these glorified the confederate cause of slavery, the flag was banned in the 1980s, and the "Rebels" name was removed by the School Committee in 2020, during the uprise of the Black Lives Matter movement and George Floyd protests. In April 2021, after a student and staff vote, Walpole High School adapted a new mascot, "Timberwolves".

Notable alumni
 Todd Collins, football quarterback
 Mike Milbury, former Boston Bruins player and head coach, commentator at NBCSN
 Joe Morgan, former Boston Red Sox manager and professional baseball player (Milwaukee Braves, Kansas City Athletics, Philadelphia Phillies, Cleveland Indians, St. Louis Cardinals)

References

External links
 

Public high schools in Massachusetts
Walpole, Massachusetts
Bay State Conference
Schools in Norfolk County, Massachusetts